The 1991–92 Drexel Dragons men's basketball team represented Drexel University  during the 1991–92 NCAA Division I men's basketball season. The Dragons, led by 1st year head coach Bill Herrion, played their home games at the Daskalakis Athletic Center and were members of the North Atlantic Conference (NAC).

The team finished the season 16–14, and finished in 2nd place in the NAC in the regular season.

Roster

Schedule

|-
!colspan=9 style="background:#F8B800; color:#002663;"| Regular season
|-

|-
!colspan=9 style="background:#F5CF47; color:#002663;"| AEC tournament

Awards
Clarence Armstrong
NAC All-Tournament Team

Jonathan Raab
NAC All-Conference Second Team
NAC Player of the Week

Michael Thompson
NAC All-Conference First Team
NAC All-Tournament Team
NAC Player of the Week

References

Drexel Dragons men's basketball seasons
Drexel
1991 in sports in Pennsylvania
1992 in sports in Pennsylvania